Paraya Dhan is a 1971 Indian Hindi-language drama film directed by Rajendra Bhatia. The film stars Balraj Sahni, Rakesh Roshan, Hema Malini in lead roles.

Cast
 Balraj Sahni as Govindram
 Rakesh Roshan as Shankar
 Hema Malini as Rajni
 Jayshree T. as Meena
 Abhi Bhattacharya as Jwala Sahay
 Achala Sachdev as Mrs. Sahay
 Ajit as Heeralal
 Om Prakash as Gangaram

Production 
The film was predominantly shot in Kullu Manali.

Soundtrack 
Music for the film was directed by R. D. Burman.

References

External links 
 

1971 films
1970s Hindi-language films
Films scored by R. D. Burman